Victims of Passion is a 1922 German silent film directed by Paul Czinner.

Cast
In alphabetical order

References

Bibliography

External links

1922 films
Films of the Weimar Republic
Films directed by Paul Czinner
German silent feature films
German black-and-white films